Blue Light is a 1966 American espionage drama television series starring Robert Goulet and Christine Carère about the adventures of an American double agent in Nazi Germany during World War II. It aired from January 12 to May 18, 1966.

A theatrical movie, I Deal in Danger, was created by editing Blue Lights first four episodes together into a continuous story. I Deal in Danger was released in 1966 after Blue Lights cancellation.

Synopsis

Prior to Nazi Germanys conquest of Europe, the United States places 18 sleeper agents – collectively forming an espionage organization called "Code: Blue Light" – inside Germany, assigned to penetrate the German high command during World War II. Journalist David March is one of them. He passes himself off to the Germans as a foreign correspondent who has officially renounced his American citizenship and come to Germany in order to support the Nazi cause. The Germans put him to work as a writer and broadcaster of Nazi propaganda – and occasionally as a spy for Germany. The Germans catch and execute the other 17 Blue Light agents, and as the lone survivor March must work hard to maintain his cover and avoid detection and arrest by German counterintelligence agents while secretly spying for the Allies. He is so deeply undercover that except for a few United States Government officials who know that he is a double agent loyal to the United States, the entire world believes him to be a pro-Nazi traitor – so much so that not only does he discover that a woman he loves has committed suicide because of his supposed support for Nazism, but he must also avoid capture or assassination by Allied intelligence agencies unaware that he secretly works for the Allies.

Marchs confidante, assistant, and contact with the underground is Suzanne Duchard, also a double agent who poses as a French Gestapo agent who hates him. She knows that he is a Blue Light double agent, and secretly both supports his espionage activities against the Germans and falls in love with him.

In his adventures, March sees a lot of action and faces many moral dilemmas, such as tough choices between carrying out his orders and protecting innocents. He often kills in order to maintain his cover or fulfill a mission.

Cast

Robert Goulet as David March
Christine Carère as Suzanne Duchard

Production

Walter Grauman and Larry Cohen created Blue Light, and Buck Houghton produced it. Episode directors included Grauman, Robert Butler, James Goldstone, Walter Graham, Gerd Oswald, and Leo Penn. Writers included Cohen, Merwin Bloch, Walter Brough, Dick Carr, Jamie Farr, Harold Livingston, H. Bud Otto, Brad Radnitz, Curtis Sanders, Donald S. Sanford, Roger Swaybill, Jack Turley, and Dan Ullman. Goulet's production company Rogo Productions produced the show in association with Twentieth Century Fox Television, and Lalo Schifrin composed its theme music, with Schifrin, Dave Grusin, Joseph Mullendore and Pete Rugolo writing episode scores. Except for its first episode, Blue Light was filmed entirely at Bavarian Studios in Munich, West Germany – according to Goulet, the first American television show filmed in color in Europe.

Following the cancellation of Blue Light, its first four episodes, which told a continuous story of David Marchs efforts targeting a German super-weapon facility at Grossmuchen, Germany, were edited together to create a movie. Entitled I Deal in Danger, it was released theatrically in the United States in December 1966 and in other countries in 1967 and 1968.

Episodes

Sources:

Broadcast history

Blue Light premiered on ABC on January 12, 1966. It was cancelled after the broadcast of its seventeenth episode on May 18, 1966. Reruns of the show continued to air in its regular time slot until August 31, 1966. It aired on Wednesday at 8:30 p.m. throughout its run.

Critical reception

Blue Light was violent by the standards of television in the mid-1960s; in situations where other television heroes knocked out guards and other opponents, March knifed them to death. It was credited for its gritty depiction of espionage in World War II and for the difficult moral choices it posed. Best known as a singer rather than an actor, Goulet received good reviews for his believable portrayal of March, and the show was fast-paced, with tight plots that kept moving. It also featured some of the best television character actors of the 1960s as its guest stars. Carère, however, was viewed as a liability for the show, especially in the romantic subplot between her character and Goulets. The shows 30-minute format also worked against it, forcing episode writers to meet time constraints in part by making David Marchs opponents shallow as characters and too easy for him to outwit.

References

External links
 
 Blue Light opening credits (at 5:40 of video) on YouTube
 Scene (1) from Blue Light episode "Traitor's Blood" on YouTube
 Scene (2) from Blue Light episode "Traitor's Blood" on YouTube
 Scene (3) from Blue Light episode "Traitor's Blood" on YouTube
 Scene (4) from Blue Light episode "Traitor's Blood" on YouTube
 Scene (5) from Blue Light episode "Traitor's Blood" on YouTube
 Scene (6) from Blue Light episode "Traitor's Blood" on YouTube
 Scene (7) from Blue Light episode "Traitor's Blood" on YouTube
 Scene (1) from Blue Light episode "Field of Dishonor" on YouTube
 Scene (2) from Blue Light episode "Field of Dishonor" on YouTube
 Scene (3) from Blue Light episode "Field of Dishonor" on YouTube
 Scene (4) from Blue Light episode "Field of Dishonor" on YouTube

American Broadcasting Company original programming
1966 American television series debuts
1966 American television series endings
1960s American drama television series
American spy drama television series
World War II television drama series
English-language television shows
Television series created by Larry Cohen
Television series based on actual events
Television shows set in Germany
Television series by 20th Century Fox Television
Television series about journalism